The Eugene J. McCarthy Center for Public Policy and Civic Engagement at Saint John's University, serving the College of Saint Benedict and Saint John's University in central Minnesota, is a non-partisan learning and outreach center aimed at fostering enhanced civic engagement and dialog about public policy. The Center sponsors the annual Eugene J. McCarthy Lecture, along with a variety of other programs aimed at CSB and SJU students, alumnae, alumni, faculty and staff, and the broader community. The Center serves students at both the College of Saint Benedict and Saint John’s University.

History
The Center was founded in 2006 in honor of Eugene J. McCarthy, the late Senator and 1935 Saint John’s graduate. The McCarthy Center is directed by Dr. Matt Lindstrom.  Lindstrom is currently the Edward L. Henry Professor of Political Science at the College of Saint Benedict and Saint John’s University.

Mission statement
The McCarthy Center aims: To cultivate the habit of promoting the common good through an integrative environment for learning and To promote the value of politics; our shared identity as citizens; our engagement in public work.

Programs

Eugene J. McCarthy Lecture
The annual public lectureship carries McCarthy’s deep commitment to the ideals and principles of democratic self-government. It seeks to inspire a new generation of young people to pursue fresh ideas, to challenge the status quo, to effect positive change in their communities and, like McCarthy himself, to lead with honesty, integrity, and courage.

Past lecturers
2007: E.J. Dionne
2008: Julian Bond
2009: Chuck Hagel
2010: Amy Klobuchar
2011: Mark Shields
2012: Tom Brokaw
2013: Cokie Roberts

Mentor Program
The McCarthy Center Mentor Program connects CSB and SJU students with individual political and community leaders and offers a roadmap for mentorship and networking. Through informational interviews, job shadowing, resume critiques, and career discussions, students gain a greater awareness of multiple civic options as well as avenues for success in political and civic life.

Polidazzle
Each December, the McCarthy Center hosts the Mentor Program networking event called Polidazzle for CSB/SJU students, alumni/alumnae, staff, and faculty interested in public policy and civic life. The gathering is an excellent opportunity for current students to meet alumni/ae who are active in civic and political life as professionals or volunteers.  This open house reception is filled with stories, drinks and abundant hors d'oeuvres.

Politics and a Pint
The McCarthy Center sponsors this monthly series of informal discussions on issues related to public policy and politics, that is, any type of social interaction involving decision-making. "Politics and a Pint" invites faculty members, student leaders, administrators, alums, politicians and community members to talk with students in an informal atmosphere without academic pressures, and about current issues which may normally not enter the classroom.

Politics and a Pint is held at Brother Willie's Pub at St. John's University.  All majors and all ages are welcome to attend any portion of Politics and a Pint. Pizza and non-alcoholic beverages are always provided. Attendees age 21 and over may purchase pints at the BWP bar.

Study tours
The McCarthy Center believes in the importance of experiential learning as a way to engage students in the many layers of the policy making process. Study tours bring students face-to-face with key players and organizations working on current policy issues.

In the 2012–2013 academic year, the McCarthy Center led two study tours to Washington, D.C. While on the week-long trip, students experienced United States history and culture—touring the Capitol Building, the White House, the State Department and many, many monuments.

McCarthy Residency
The McCarthy Residency showcases the work and skills of someone who has a distinguished career in public service, policy, or politics through a week-long on-campus residency. Through visits to classes, cafeterias, practices, and public programs, the McCarthy resident engages a wide spectrum of the CSB/SJU community and the general public. The McCarthy residency culminates in a dinner honoring the resident and a final keynote program open to the campus community and the public. The primary purpose of the residency is to give students extended access to someone with real knowledge and wisdom about policy, civic engagement, and public life.

Past recipients
 Al Eisele 1958, Editor of The Hill
 Dave Durenberger 1955, former U.S. Senator
 Sean Kershaw, CEO of the Citizens League
 Kathleen Hall Jamieson of the Annenberg Public Policy Center of the University of Pennsylvania
 John Chromy 1964, CHF International
 Gary Eichten 1969, Minnesota Public Radio News
 Lino Rulli 1993, SOT 1995, host of The Catholic Guy Show

CSBSJU Political Science Department's Washington, D.C. Summer Study
The McCarthy Center supports the Political Science Department's Washington, D.C. Summer Study Program, which sends a group of students to Washington, D.C. every summer to serve as interns in government, political, or non-profit offices while earning academic credit.

Scholarships

John E. Brandl
John Brandl was a 1959 graduate of Saint John's. The John Brandl Scholars program celebrates Brandl's lifelong commitment to mentorship and scholarship in higher education, public policy and politics. The endowment funds summer internships in public policy and leadership development activities such as conferences and trainings. These internships will range from local to international policy arenas, reflecting Brandl's diverse career and CSB/SJU's commitment to ethical leadership and the common good.

John Brandl Scholars receive $4,000 summer stipends and are offered select invitations for McCarthy Center events and mini-grants to cover travel or other expenses related to civic or scholarly engagement.

Funding
Funding for the McCarthy Center was originally provided through a grant from the Bush Foundation to sponsor "learning centers" at CSB/SJU. A permanent endowment has been created through the support of the Whalen Foundation.

References

External links
 Eugene J. McCarthy Center for Public Policy
 College of Saint Benedict and Saint John's University

College of Saint Benedict and Saint John's University